Kondor is a city in Sheshtaraz District, Khalilabad County, Razavi Khorasan Province, Iran. At the 2006 census, its population was 5,700, in 1,610 families.  "Kondor" means "frankincense" in Persian.

Al-Kunduri, a prominent Persian vizier of the Seljuq Empire, was from this city.

Historical sites, ancient artifacts and tourism

Kondor Ab anbars 

Kondor Ab anbars is two historical Ab anbars belongs to the first Pahlavi period and is located in Khalilabad County, Sheshtaraz District, Kondor village.

Kondor Castle 

Kondor Castle is a historical castle located in Khalilabad County in Razavi Khorasan Province, The longevity of this fortress dates back to the 5th to 7th centuries AH.

References 

Populated places in Khalilabad County
Cities in Razavi Khorasan Province